CJCN-FM (91.5 FM) is an ethnic radio station in Surrey, British Columbia, Canada. The station broadcasts for the South Asian communities in Surrey and other cities east of Vancouver. It is owned by Akash Broadcasting Inc.

History
In 2016, the Canadian Radio-television and Telecommunications Commission considered seven applications for a new commercial ethnic radio station to serve Surrey and Vancouver. The Akash application won approval from the CRTC for repatriating revenues lost to cross-border ethnic broadcasters based in northwestern Washington; it specified an entirely ethnic format serving the area's South Asian population, with more than 75 percent in languages other than English; 121 hours a week of local programming, about 40 percent of that in speech programs; and 50 percent Canadian content in music. Before launch, the transmitter site proposed was lost, and a new one was approved.

On-air testing for CJCN-FM began December 20, 2019.

In 2021, CKER-FM, CJCN-FM's sister station in Edmonton, Alberta, was rebranded from 101.7 World FM to Connect FM 101.7.

References

External links
 
 

JCN
JCN
Radio stations established in 2019
2019 establishments in British Columbia
Akash Broadcasting radio stations